is the debut studio album by Japanese singer Miki Nakatani. It was released on September 4, 1996, by For Life Records. Following her departure from the girl group Sakurakko Club in 1993, Nakatani concentrated on her acting career, before returning to music under the tutelage of musician Ryuichi Sakamoto. 

Nakatani was noted for her "cool" vocal performance on Shokumotsu Rensa, and the album features contributions from Taeko Onuki, Yasuharu Konishi of Pizzicato Five, and Arto Lindsay.

The album was preceded by two singles: "Mind Circus" and "Strange Paradise", the former of which peaked at number twenty on the Oricon charts.

Background 
Nakatani began her career as a member of the girl group Sakurakko Club, performing with the group from 1991 to 1993. During this time, she formed the duo Key West Club.

Nakatani herself had always been a fan of Sakamoto's work, and frequently attended his concerts. During a chance encounter, the two hit it off after learning that their tastes and hobbies matched. Sakamoto reportedly held a long-term desire to produce a female artist, and others opined that Nakatani saw it as an opportunity to dispel her idol image. The web magazine Pop Master compared their partnership to that of French musician Serge Gainsbourg and actress Jane Birkin.

Lyricist Masao Urino was recruited by Sakamoto to work on the album, writing the words to five demos. In a 2016 retrospective with Oricon, celebrating 35 years of Urino's work, he recounted that period as one of the longest in his career, as he pressured himself to match the quality of Sakamoto's "imposing" arrangements and spent a month on each song. Urino reflected on their collaboration with fondness as Sakamoto gave him a newfound confidence, teaching Urino to write with "instinct".

Critical reception 
CD Journal gave the album a positive review, comparing Nakatani to singer Tomomi Kahala and highlighting the "gorgeous" contributions by Onuki and Konishi. Despite Nakatani's weak vocals, Cyzo magazine praised its ability to "sew skillfully" and balance Shokumotsu Rensa—in that it neither relied on "fluffy" atmospherics, nor did it rely on "diva" vocals front and center. As part of a feature evaluating Japanese actresses' forgotten music careers, Cyzo awarded Nakatani three stars for her singing ability and a "0" for her "dark past" or kurorekishi, meaning that the album and her subsequent works were regarded highly.

Track listing 
All songs composed and arranged by Ryuichi Sakamoto except where noted.

 Tracks 1, 2, 6, 7, and 9 are stylized in all uppercase.
 Tracks 5 and 10 are stylized in all lowercase.

Charts and sales

References 

1996 debut albums
Albums produced by Ryuichi Sakamoto
Albums by Japanese artists